H Sudarshan Ballal (born; 15 September 1954) is an Indian kidney transplant physician, nephrologist currently director of Manipal Institute of Nephrology and Urology, the chairman of the Medical Advisory Board of Manipal Hospitals Group and Senate Member of Manipal University.

Ballal is also the adjunct professor of medicine at Manipal University, a Clinical Professor of Medicine at Saint Louis University Medical Centre, Chairman of the Board at Stempeutics Research Pvt. Ltd. and examiner for the Royal College of Physicians London.

He performed the first cadaver Kidney transplantation in Karnataka. In 2005, he was awarded the prestigious Rajyotsava Award by the Government of Karnataka for his contributions to the field of Medicine. He was awarded an honorary FRCP (Fellow of the Royal College of Physicians of London)  without having worked or trained at any of the hospitals in UK.

Ballal actively supports in Prime Minister Narendra Modi's Ayushman Bharat Yojana campaign.

Ballal is the member of the Consultative Group of COVID-19 fight. And provide supports to the Government to fight against coronavirus.

Early life and career
Ballal was born in Udupi, a coastal district of Karnataka, India. He did his MBBS degree from Kasturba Medical College, Manipal in 1977 and won the Dr. T. M. A. Pai Gold Medal for the Best Outgoing Student for the year 1976. After completing his MBBS degree he went to US for further study of M.D. His teachers in the US accepted his training in India very well and his three-year program was relaxed by a year and he completed M.D. in just two years. After obtaining his M.D degree, he did his Residency at Deaconess Hospital, St. Louis, Missouri, USA. He then pursued his Fellowship in Nephrology at St. Louis University Medical Centre, Missouri, USA.

His department at Manipal Hospitals performs more than four thousand dialysis every month. The two-year training program in Nephrology started by him in the year 1999 is well-recognized by the National Board and Rajiv Gandhi University. He was conferred with the Teacher of Excellence Award, 2014 by the National Board of Examination.

As a columnist, Ballal provides his column on various news papers on regular basis.

Philanthropy
Ballal has been involved in numerous CSR activities aimed at improving the conditions of the economically disadvantaged sections of the society and of those afflicted with serious kidney issues who are unable to access good quality medical care. Launched free Pediatric Kidney Transplants (Kidney Transplants for children) for disadvantaged sections of the society in the name of Master Yatarth, whose parents donated his organs after his unfortunate demise. This program is jointly shared by Belanje Sanjeeva Hegde Trust and Manipal Hospitals, Bangalore. He conducts in awareness programs about preventive aspects of kidney disease in association with philanthropic organizations like Rotary Club India, Lions Club India. Health insurance policies for poor people covering all diseases.

Awards and achievements
Rajyotsava Award by Government of Karnataka, 2005
Namma Bengaluru Award, February 2010
Padma Awards nominee 2014

References

1954 births
Living people
Indian nephrologists